The Belles Amours River is a salmon river in the Côte-Nord region of Quebec, Canada. It empties into the Gulf of Saint Lawrence.

Location

The mouth of the river is in the municipality of Bonne-Espérance in Le Golfe-du-Saint-Laurent Regional County Municipality.

Name

The harbor was called "Beaulsanim" by the Basque captain Martin de Hoyarçabal in his Voyages Avantureux (1579).
Some authors think this comes from the Basque word balza, meaning coast or place with several coasts.
Others think it comes from the French word balsamine (balsam), a plant, or which several varieties grow wild in the region.
Several early charts show variants of this word: Balsamon (1674), Balsanim (1689) and Balsamon (1694).
The cartographer Jacques-Nicolas Bellin wrote "Belsamont or Belles Amours" on his maps of 1744 and 1755.
The form "Belles Amours" prevailed from this date.

Basin

It lies between the basins of the Saint-Paul River to the west and the Brador River to the east.
It is partly in the unorganized territory of Petit-Mécatina and partly in the municipalities of Blanc-Sablon and Bonne-Espérance.

The river basin include part of the proposed Basses Collines du Lac Guernesé Biodiversity Reserve.
A map of the ecological regions of Quebec shows the river in sub-regions 6o-T, 6n-T and 6m-T of the east spruce/moss subdomain.
The river is recognized as an Atlantic salmon river.
In 2013–2017 an average of 11 salmon were reported caught each year in the river.

Notes

Sources

Rivers of Côte-Nord